The 2016–17 Polish Cup in women's football was the 33rd edition of the competition. Medyk Konin won its fifth title in a row after defeating Górnik Łęczna in the final, like in the two previous editions, but this time by a narrower 2–1 scoreline.

Results

Final match

References

Cup women